The 65th season of the Campeonato Gaúcho kicked off on August 4, 1985 and ended in December 8, 1985. Fourteen teams participated. Grêmio won their 23rd title. Gaúcho and Rio-Grandense were relegated.

Participating teams

System 
The championship would have three stages.:

 First round: The fourteen clubs played each other in a single round-robin system. The team with the most points qualified to the Finals.
 Second round: The fourteen clubs played each other in a single round-robin system. The team with the most points qualified to the Finals. The two teams with the fewest points in the sum of both rounds were relegated.
 Finals: The round winners would play to define the champions. If the same team won both rounds it won the title automatically.

Championship

First phase

First round

Second round

Final standings

References 

Campeonato Gaúcho seasons
Gaúcho